The 2018 season was the 9th season for the Indian Premier League franchise Rajasthan Royals.

Offseason

Support staff changes
 In January 2018, former Royals team director Zubin Bharucha was appointed as the team's head of cricket
 In February 2018, former Royals captain Shane Warne was named team mentor
 In February 2018, Sairaj Bahutule was appointed spin bowling coach
 In March 2018, Amol Muzumdar and Dishant Yagnik were announced to be the team's batting coach and fielding coach respectively

Others
In January 2018, the BCCI cleared Sawai Mansingh Stadium in Jaipur to host the home matches of the Royals. The Royals had last played at Jaipur in 2013, after which they had to shift their base to Ahmedabad and Mumbai in 2014 and 2015 due to the BCCI's ban on the Rajasthan Cricket Association.

In March 2018, in an event in Jaipur, the franchise unveiled the new team anthem "Phir Halla Bol" by Ila Arun.

Squad 
 Players with international caps are listed in bold.

Season

League table

Results

League matches

References

External links

Rajasthan Royals seasons